Karin Johanna (Kajsa) Grytt (born 20 June 1961) is a Swedish punk-rocker, guitarist, singer and songwriter. She was between 1979 and 1985 guitarist in the band Tant Strul and 1985 to 1988 and around 1996 a member of the duo Kajsa och Malena. Grytt wrote most of the lyrics to the band's songs.

Grytt is nowadays a solo singer  and made her musical comeback in 2003. She played along with David Giese during a few years, and then along with Jari Haapalainen, who also produced her two latest solo albums. She has so far made five solo albums and on her album Brott & straff several of the songs were written by female prisoners. On the same album Grytt did a duet with Joakim Thåström.

In 2011, Kajsa Grytt released the album En kvinna under påverkan and the biography book  Boken om mig själv (en:the book about myself). In April 2011 Sveriges Television broadcast an interview with Grytt where she talked about the book and the new album and how she looks on her life these days.

In 2014, Grytt released her first novel book called  Nio dagar, nio nätter. And in late 2014, she participated in season five of the TV4 show Så mycket bättre.

Discography

Singles

References

External links

1961 births
Swedish women singers
Swedish women writers
Living people
Swedish women novelists
Feminist musicians